Jim Deaton is a former American football coach.  He served as the head football coach at Campbellsville University from 2005 to 2007, compiling a record of 4–26.

Coaching career
Deaton was the third head football coach at Campbellsville University in Campbellsville, Kentucky serving for three seasons, from 2005 until 2007.  His coaching record at Campbellsville was 4–26.

Head coaching record

References

External links
 Carson–Newman profile

Year of birth missing (living people)
Living people
Campbellsville Tigers football coaches
Carson–Newman Eagles football coaches
Carson–Newman Eagles football players
High school football coaches in Tennessee
High school football coaches in Virginia